

England

Head coach: Geoff Cooke

 Paul Ackford
 Rob Andrew
 Will Carling (c.)
 Wade Dooley
 Jerry Guscott
 Nigel Heslop
 Richard Hill
 Simon Hodgkinson
 Jason Leonard
 Brian Moore
 Jeff Probyn
 Dean Richards
 Mike Teague
 Rory Underwood
 Peter Winterbottom

 England used the same 15 players in the four games

France

Head coach: Daniel Dubroca

 Abdelatif Benazzi
 Pierre Berbizier
 Serge Blanco (c.)
 Xavier Blond
 Laurent Cabannes
 Didier Camberabero
 Marc Cécillon
 Denis Charvet
 Christophe Deslandes
 Jean-François Gourragne
 Thierry Lacroix
 Jean-Baptiste Lafond
 Patrice Lagisquet
 Grégoire Lascubé
 Philippe Marocco
 Pascal Ondarts
 Olivier Roumat
 Philippe Saint-André
 Philippe Sella
 Michel Tachdjian

Ireland

Head coach: Ciaran Fitzgerald

 Jack Clarke
 Keith Crossan
 David Curtis
 Des Fitzgerald
 John Fitzgerald
 Neil Francis
 Mick Galwey
 Simon Geoghegan
 Gordon Hamilton
 Kenneth Hooks
 Michael Kiernan
 Phillip Matthews
 Brendan Mullin
 Kenny Murphy
 Brian Rigney
 Brian Robinson
 Rob Saunders (c.)
 Brian Smith
 Steve Smith
 Jim Staples

Scotland

Head coach: Jim Telfer

 John Allan
 Gary Armstrong
 Paul Burnell
 Craig Chalmers
 Damian Cronin
 Chris Gray
 Gavin Hastings
 Scott Hastings
 John Jeffrey
 Sean Lineen
 Kenny Milne
 Alex Moore
 David Sole (c.)
 Tony Stanger
 Derek Turnbull
 Derek White

Wales

Head coach: Ron Waldron

 Paul Arnold
 Chris Bridges
 Alun Carter
 Tony Clement
 John Davies
 Phil Davies
 Ieuan Evans
 Steve Ford
 Glenn George
 Scott Gibbs
 Mike Griffiths
 Neil Jenkins
 Arthur Jones
 Robert Jones
 Paul Knight
 Emyr Lewis
 Gareth Llewellyn
 Glyn Llewellyn
 Martin Morris
 Paul Thorburn (c.)
 Brian Williams

Six Nations Championship squads